Khushnood Nabizada (born March 27, 1987) is a journalist, diplomat, peace campaigner, and entrepreneur from Afghanistan, lives in the USA. He is the founder and owner of The Khaama Press News Agency, a leading news organization for Afghanistan.

Early life and education 
Khushnood Nabizada was born on 27 March 1987 in Shibar District, Bamyan Province. He was eight years old when his family moved to Baghlan Province and started to live in Puli Khumri town. He was only a class 5th student when Taliban conquered Baghlan province, and he and his family migrated to Pakistan. He returned to his country Afghanistan in 2003, after the fall of the Taliban.

He graduated from Habibia High School in 2006. Khushnood got his bachelor's degree in business administration from Kardan University in 2012. He has obtained his master's degree in International Relation from Kateb University, Kabul.

Career 
Khushnood founded The Khaama Press News Agency, the largest online news service of Afghanistan in October 2010 in Kabul. Khaama Press publishes in English, Persian and Pashto languages.

In 2011 he founded an IT company under the name of Barg Sabz that provides web designing, web hosting and domain registration services for the individuals, companies, and organizations operating in Afghanistan.

Khushnood worked as Senior Business Executive at Insurance Corporation of Afghanistan from 2007 to early 2014. In the meantime, he managed to supervise and preside operations of Khaama Press and Barg Sabz Web Designing firm.

Khaama Press is one of the leading and popular news agencies in Kabul, Afghanistan. Khaama's web portal was recognized as the most visited news website in 2020.

Mr. Nabizada joined the Afghanistan government in 2016 and assumed office as chief of staff to the Ministry of Urban Development and Housing on May 29, 2016. The recruitment process for this key position is approved by President Mohammad Ashraf Ghani.

Khushnood was appointed as chief of staff to the State Ministry for Peace on September 7, 2020. The recruitment process for this key position is approved by President Mohammad Ashraf Ghani.

The Khaama Press News Agency

Why did Khushnood Nabizada decide to invest and establish Khaama Press, he answers: Afghanistan entered into a new era with the assistance of the international community in 2001 after the fall of ‘Taliban’, an extremist religious group that led the country for 5 years. Since then, ‘Afghanistan’ received a large number of development funds from the International society, but most of these grants were not spent ‘transparent’ as a result of poor monitoring and control. Media and press agencies are always a great help and a powerful tool to keep eyes on the executive and implementing agencies, promoting ‘transparency’. I loved to be the ‘throat’ of my people and ‘share’ their pains, failures, success and developments by writing. Therefore, I established Khaama Press back in October 2010 to help the journalism and freedom of speech in Afghanistan. Afghanistan has been in the midst of civil war and violence for more than 40 years, in the absence of media and ‘freedom of speech, has much to say, therefore, independent news agencies such as ‘Khaama Press’ was needed to report on security, society, business and political issues to provide awareness and assist the international partner in their decision making with providing them the accurate and on-time information.

The Canada Now

In March 2020, Khushnood Nabizada and his friend and former colleague Ahmad Shah Ghani Zada established a news portal for US & Canada under the name of The Canada Now. The agency's operation was interrupted for almost a year due to the COVID-19 pandemic but resumed in May 2021. The online news portal covers World, US & Canada, Business, Politics, Entertainment, Sports and Immigration. The Canada Now publishes news and reports on its web portal, social media accounts including Twitter (@TheCanadaNow) and Facebook (The Canada Now).

Escaped Bomb Blast 
Khushnood Nabizada survived a bomb blast unharmed on February 1, 2021. The incident happened in PD10, Kabul, while Khushnood was on the way to work. Several national and international agencies including President Ghani, Dr. Abdullah Abdullah, and US, UK, and NATO Ambassadors condemned the attack on a peace worker and media owner.

Moving to United States of America 
The flee of Afghanistan's former president Mohammad Ashraf Ghani on August 15, 2021, put the country into chaos and crisis as a result of which tens of thousands of Afghans fled the country. Khushnood Nabizada as a senior official of the Afghanistan government and media owner who was targeted by the extremist had to leave his country too. He flew to the United States of America with the U.S Airforce plane as the evacuation program from Afghanistan together with his family including his spouse, kids, parents, and siblings. Now, Khushnood actively advocates for freedom of speech and human rights in Afghanistan.

Quote
"Emigration/Immigration is never a fantasy, but a compulsion to escape death." - Khushnood Nabizada

The quote has been used for the first time by Khushnood Nabizada in his life story published by Richmond Times-Dispatch in January 2022. He has said it when he wanted to express his feelings about how hard it was for him to leave everything behind and flee from his homeland Afghanistan in August 2021.

References

1987 births
Living people
Afghan journalists
People from Kabul